Asavka (Aśaw) is a rural locality (a village) in Toshkurovsky Selsoviet, Baltachevsky District, Bashkortostan, Russia. The population was 416 as of 2010. There are 3 streets.

Geography 
Asavka is located 23 km northeast of Starobaltachevo (the district's administrative centre) by road. Mikhaylovka is the nearest rural locality.

References 

Rural localities in Baltachevsky District